Soy Mi Destino is a compilation album by Mayré Martínez from the songs she sang in Latin American Idol, which also includes a DVD with the live performances from the show. Recorded in Mexico in early 2007, it was only released in Mexico through the internet and selected music stores, and in Venezuela, where it debuted at number 4 in the Venezuelan music chart.

The first single, "Soy Mi Destino", was released in February 2007. "Corazón Espinado" was released as the second single in July 2007.

Track listing

CD

DVD

Release history

Notes
 The album only charted in Venezuela.
 The songs "Soy Mi Destino" and "Quiero Soñar" were written especially for the Latin American Idol winner.
 Mayre sang "Corazón Espinado" in the second season of the show.

References

2007 albums
Mayré Martínez albums